Jollytown is an unincorporated community in Gilmore Township, Greene County, in the U.S. state of Pennsylvania.

History
Jollytown was founded by Titus Jolley, and named for him. A post office called Jollytown was established in 1845, and remained in operation until it was discontinued in 1954.

References

Unincorporated communities in Greene County, Pennsylvania
Unincorporated communities in Pennsylvania